Ailinu'er (born July 16, 1979) is a male Chinese freestyle wrestler who competed at the 2004 Summer Olympics.

He finished 13th in the 60 kg Greco-Roman competition.

External links
profile

1979 births
Living people
Chinese male sport wrestlers
Olympic wrestlers of China
People from Ili
Wrestlers at the 2004 Summer Olympics
Sportspeople from Xinjiang
21st-century Chinese people